Duvvuri Venkata Ramana Shastri (1897–1972), popularly known as the Kalaprapurna Duvvuri, was a Telugu - Sanskrit scholar of the 20th century. He studied Sanskrit and worked as Telugu Lecturer for more than six decades. He wrote Ramaneeyam a book on Telugu grammar and he translated Pingarli Surana kalapurnodayam  to Telugu as "Madhura Lalasa". In addition he wrote an autobiography. His autobiography was focused on many teachers and giants from Telugu literature rather than his birth and family details. He held high standards for good hand writing.

Early life and personal life
Shri Duvvuri Venkata Ramana Shastri was born to Parvateesham, an affluent  Brahmin in Masaka Pally, East Godavari District, A.P. India.

Early career
Duvvuri taught in various colleges in Vishakhapattanam, Guntur.

School of Thought
Shri Duvvuri was expert in teaching Telugu grammar using simple explanations. He viewed the two languages, Samskrutam and Telugu, as two eyes that need each other to get a perfect view.

Literary career
Duvvuri Shashtri's literary works includes the following:

 Ramaṇīyamu
 Telugu Vyakarana Pada Koshamu

Autobiography
He wrote his memoirs or biography which was published in 1976 as Kaḷāprapūrṇa Duvvūri Veṅkaṭaramaṇaśāstri sviyacaritra.

Awards and recognition

 Kalaprapoorna by Andhra University.

References

1897 births
1976 deaths
20th-century Indian translators
Telugu writers
Writers from Andhra Pradesh
People from East Godavari district